Norwood is a 1970 American comedy film that reunites True Grit co-stars Glen Campbell and Kim Darby, also featuring Joe Namath.  It was based on the novel of the same title, written by Charles Portis (who also wrote True Grit), but updated from the original 1950s setting to 1970.

The film marked the penultimate screen appearance of actor Jack Haley, the father of the director Jack Haley Jr.

Plot 
Norwood Pratt has just finished his enlistment in the United States Marine Corps and is on his way home from Vietnam.  A musician, his one great ambition is to appear on the radio program Louisiana Hayride.

Along the way, Norwood meets a variety of characters, including Grady Fling, a flim-flam man; Yvonne Phillips, a hooker; Marie, a jaded would-be starlet; and his Marine buddy Joe William Reese.

However, the most important person that he meets is Rita Lee Chipman, the "right kind of girl," who is unfortunately an unwed soon-to-be mother at a time when this was uncommon and somewhat shameful. She supports him and is there when Norwood finally reaches the KWKH studio as his dream comes true.

Cast

 Glen Campbell as Norwood
 Kim Darby as Rita
 Joe Namath as Joe
 Carol Lynley as Yvonne
 Pat Hingle as Grady Fring
 Tisha Sterling as Marie
 Dom DeLuise as Bill Bird
 Leigh French as Vernell Bird
 Meredith MacRae as Kay
 Sammy Jackson as Wayne T.E.B. Walker
 Billy Curtis as Edmund B. Ratner
 Edith Atwater as Angry Bus Passenger
 Jimmy Boyd as Jeeter
 Virginia Capers as Ernestine
 Cass Daley as Mrs. Remley
 Merie Earle as Grandma Whichcoat
 Jack Haley as Mr. Reese
 David Huddleston as Uncle Lonnie
 Gil Lamb as Mr. Remley

Release
Norwood opened May 21, 1970 in Dallas, Texas before opening in 450 theaters on May 27.

Reception
Howard Thompson of The New York Times wrote that "the picture is a showcase for the guitar-playing Campbell. And it is an entirely shapeless affair that simply bumps him around the country. A pity, too, for he is a pleasant, natural actor — 'True Grit' proved that — and he sings a clutch of guitar ballads easily and winningly." Variety called it "little more than perpetuation of the Elvis Presley format for Glen Campbell, complete with a parade of pretty faces and uninspired countryish rhythm by Presley tunesmith Mac Davis." Gene Siskel of the Chicago Tribune gave the film 1 star out of 4 and described its humor as "hokey, but harmless." Charles Champlin of the Los Angeles Times called it "an amiable, easygoing, often quite funny piece of entertainment." Richard Combs of The Monthly Film Bulletin wrote, "At its best, Marguerite Roberts' screenplay provides some amiable regional comedy; at its worst, when tidying up the novel's loose ends (complete to Norwood's final appearance on country and western radio), it suggests how the material of Midnight Cowboy might have looked if turned into a vehicle for Elvis Presley."

See also
 List of American films of 1970

References

External links
 
 

1970 films
1970 comedy films
1970s comedy road movies
American comedy road movies
Films about music and musicians
Films based on American novels
Films directed by Jack Haley Jr.
Films produced by Hal B. Wallis
Paramount Pictures films
Films set in 1970
1970s English-language films
1970s American films